John of Debar (fl. 1018–1037) was an 11th-century Bulgarian clergyman. He was a bishop under Emperor Samuel of Bulgaria. According to Srđan Pirivatrić he became the last Bulgarian patriarch David in 1016. He remained in office, becoming the first Archbishop of Ohrid, after the fall of the First Bulgarian Empire to Byzantium. When in 1018 Emperor Basil II managed to conquer Bulgaria, he issued a decree to downgrade the Patriarchate of the Bulgarian Orthodox Church to the Archbishopric of Ohrid, which remained autocephalous and corresponded to the newly formed theme of Bulgaria. John was chosen to be the first Archbishop of Ohrid. According to 17th-century French historian du Cange, John was born in a village around the town of Debar in today North Macedonia, and had been a hegumen in a Debar monastery. He remained head of the Archbishopric until his death in 1037.

References and notes

10th-century births
1037 deaths
11th-century Byzantine people
11th-century Bulgarian people
Archbishops of Ohrid
People from Debar Municipality
People from medieval Macedonia
Byzantine people of Slavic descent